In addition to the national Libertarian Party in the United States, 48 states operate a state Libertarian Party, plus one representing the District of Columbia.

List of parties

See also
 List of state parties of the Democratic Party (United States)
 List of state Green Parties in the United States
 List of state parties of the Republican Party (United States)

Notes

References

 
Libertarian Party